is a Japanese Slice of life manga series created and illustrated by Sayuri Tatsuyama, serialized in Shogakukan's shōjo magazine Ciao from August 2005 to November 2008. Five tankōbon volumes were serialized in April 2006 to November 2008. Viz Media currently holds the license for the manga series. An anime adaptation by Group TAC officially aired on TV Aichi from July 6, 2007 to 28 September 2007, adapting some of the chapters from the first three volumes.

Summary
Chima is a young female rabbit who lives in the Crescent Moon Forest, a forest untouched by humans. Being friends with Gaku and Haru, she lives a rather good life but she desires to travel with Tabi-Usagi San, a male rabbit she adores but is deemed too young. One day when she is late for school, Gaku makes fun of her for being late. The same time, Professor Hoot announces the arrival of a new student: Meru. The four explore the forest they live in, getting in and out of trouble and learning things as they grow up while at the same time, Chima setting her goals to convince Tabi-Usagi San to take her along to his travels.

Characters
Note: Characters' names in English are shown on the right

Main characters
 Clover

The main protagonist of the series, a white rabbit with a heart-shaped puff of fur at her neckline and purple eyes, she wears a four leaf clover (given from a human) next to her left ear. Chima is a lively, happy bunny, who sometimes gets into trouble, dragging her friends along. She isn't very responsible sometimes and often her mistakes can escalate into bigger troubles in which she needs to resolve. She is also shown to be a scatterbrained, usually good at cooking and bad in sewing. In the epilogue, she ends up leaving Crescent Moon Forest to travel alongside Tabi-Usagi San.

 Mallow

Chima's best friend, a light pink rabbit, with dark pink markings on her right eye all the way down to her right ear. With brown eyes and a big heart, Haru fell in love with her. She's calm, sweet, kind, and extremely intelligent. In the epilogue, she is married to Haru and had two children.

 Kale

A strong brown hare with amazing green eyes. Older brother to the sextuplets, who has to help his parents take care of them. He's friendly and loyal, but a little mysterious. He secretly has a crush on Thistle and sticks up for his friend Haru. In the end, he marries  and they had a son named .

 Shallot

A yellowish-orange rabbit with glasses. He is extremely smart and always seen with a book. Chima calls him a nerd; in other words, a bookworm. He has a secret side, which isn't all about knowledge and books. He supports his best friend Kale and has a crush on Meru. In the end of the series, he marries Meru and has a daughter named  and a son named .

 Rambler/Bramble

A male rabbit who often travels to different forests, and tells the other animals stories about his adventures. He is quite a bit older than all the other rabbits and may have a crush on Chima. Chima is supposed to travel with him when she gets older, but he always refuses. Later chapters reveals about his past when he was young, as when he was playing outside the forest he witnessed a fire caused by Humans that destroyed his home and killed off his parents. Since that incident, he has been traveling ever since and later told everything to Chima about his past suffering.

Professor Hoot is the teacher of the kids in the Crescent Moon Forest. A brown-horned owl who is Gruff, but secretly nice. Known for his dreaded invitations to his home, which usually includes bitter health tea which all his students hate, and his long stories about his youth. His father is named Rouhohhoo.

 Hickory

Hirari is Chima's babysitter, a flying squirrel. Calm, cool, collected, and nice to everyone, he is also afraid of spiders and eats a lot, and is allergic to Yum Yum Mushrooms.

Minor characters
 Clover's Family

Chima's only parents and family. Her father is a meteorologist and inventor while her mother is a renowned cook and admirer of her husband's inventions.

 Tip,  Top,  Tap,  Flip,  Flop and  Flap

Gaku's sextuplet younger brothers.

 Blackberry

A male Asian black bear cub who's a close friend of Chima and Gaku. His family specializes on making Honey.

 Forsythia

A female deer fawn, who is closely friends with Chima and Meru.

 Cinnamon

A fox who is one of the forest's biggest pranksters. He lies to the denizens of the forest and is often seen with Kururi with their schemes, but sometimes falls flat when Chima busts them.

 Twirl

Charaku's friend and partner in crime. He's a squirrel who also likes to pull pranks on the denizens of the forest, but like Charaku, he also fails when busted.

 and Skye and Cloud

Also known as the "Bulbull Brothers", they're a pair of rapping Brown-eared bulbul who sometimes annoys Chima and her friends and often competes with them.

Violet

Haru's older sister, who has a calm demeanor like him and likes flowers, especially light grass flowers. Roy, her childhood friend appears to have a crush on him. Studies the lifespan of fireflies.

Media

Manga
The manga was originally created by Tatsuyama Sayuri. It was first serialized in the August 2005 issue of Ciao and later collected in five tankōbon volumes. Viz Media licensed the manga in 2009 and all 5 volumes were being released in English and later released through Amazon Kindle for digital distribution. The manga later gained a French translation in 2016 where the manga is called "Happy Clover" and is distributed by Nobi-Nobi.

Volume list

Anime
An Anime adaptation was aired from July 6, 2007 to September 28, 2007 on Kids Station and TV Aichi in Japan. It was directed by Kazumi Nonaka and the anime only adapts the first 3 volumes of the Manga, only lasting for 13 episodes. The opening song is titled  by Marimomi, the ending theme is titled  by Mikuni Shimokawa.

Episode list

Games
There are two games, both released only in Japan.

ちゃおドリームタッチ! ハッピーあにばーさりー
 Nintendo DS
 7 December 2006

はぴはぴクローバー
 Nintendo DS
 14 February 2008

Notes

References

External links
 Hapiclo official website

Happy Happy Clover manga Volume 1 review

2005 manga
2007 anime television series debuts
Comedy anime and manga
Slice of life anime and manga
Shōjo manga
Viz Media manga
Shogakukan manga
Anime series based on manga
Comics about rabbits and hares
Animated television series about rabbits and hares
Group TAC